Alan Thomas Anderson Swinburne (born 18 May 1946) was an English professional football goalkeeper who played in the Football League for Oldham Athletic.

Personal life 
Swinburne's father Tom and brother Trevor were also professional footballers.

References 

English footballers
English Football League players
Association football goalkeepers
People from Houghton-le-Spring
Footballers from Tyne and Wear
Newcastle United F.C. players
Living people
1946 births
Oldham Athletic A.F.C. players